Lieutenant-General Baron Théophile Wahis (27 April 1844–26 January 1921) was a Belgian soldier and colonial civil servant who served as Governor-General of the Congo Free State and, subsequently, the Belgian Congo for two terms between 1891 and 1912. He was the longest ruling of Belgian colonial governors.

Career
Théophile Wahis was born in Menen in West Flanders, Belgium, on 27 April 1844 to a military family. He entered the Belgian Army and studied at the Royal Military Academy in Brussels. During the Franco-Mexican War (1864–67), Wahis volunteered for service in the Belgian Legion sent to Mexico to fight alongside French and Imperial Mexican Forces. Wahis served with distinction in Mexico, returning to the Belgian military in 1867 but was frustrated by the lack of promotion. Through General Alfred van der Smissen, the former commander of the Belgian Legion in Mexico, Wahis was introduced to King Leopold II as a possible candidate for the King's private venture in the Congo Free State.

In 1890-91, Wahis was posted to Boma as a senior civil servant in the Free State administration. His success in the role led to rapid promotion and, in 1892, he was designated the state's next Governor General, replacing Camille Janssen. Wahis' military background had a strong influence on governance in the Free State and contributed to its increasingly harsh policies of rule. He clashed particularly with more liberal colonial figures, such as Félix Fuchs and Félicien Cattier, whose own backgrounds were as civilian lawyers. According to historians Lewis H. Gann and Peter Duignan, Wahis' appointment "symbolized the increasingly exploitative nature of the Free State's administration" and the growing "Belgianization" of the colony's administration.

Wahis was a strong defender of the Free State's public record in the international press. For his services to the state, he received the honorary rank of Lieutenant General and the title of Baron in 1901. After Belgium was forced by international pressure to annex the Free State in 1908, Wahis continued as Governor-General of the new Belgian Congo. He resigned in 1912 and was succeeded by Fuchs.

Retiring from colonial administration, Baron Wahis became a businessman with a position in a company in the Dutch East Indies and in the Congo's Compagnie du Katanga. He died in January 1921. A street in Brussels and a street in Menen are named after him.

References

Citations

Bibliography

Further reading

 Archive Théophile Wahis, Royal Museum for Central Africa

1844 births
1921 deaths
People from Menen
Governors-General of the Belgian Congo
Governors-General of the Congo Free State
Belgian generals
Barons of Belgium
Royal Military Academy (Belgium) alumni